Russell Julian Hemley (26 October 1954, Berkeley, California) is an American geophysicist, solid-state physicist, and physical chemist.

Hemley grew up in California, Colorado and Utah. He studied chemistry and philosophy at Wesleyan University with bachelor's degree in 1977 and then physical chemistry at Harvard University with master's degree in 1980 and Ph.D. in 1983. As a postdoc he was at Harvard University and was from 1984 to 1987 a Carnegie fellow at the Geophysical Laboratory of the Carnegie Institution in Washington D.C. From 1987 to 2016 he was a staff member of the Geophysical Laboratory, where he was from 2007 to 2013 the director.

In the academic year 1991–1992 he was a visiting scientist at the Johns Hopkins University and in 1996 and again in 1999 at the École normale supérieure de Lyon.

Hemley's research deals with the properties of matter under high pressure with applications in geophysics, geochemistry and planetology, as well as applications in solid-state physics, chemistry, and pressure effects on biomolecules and biological systems; the applications in physics include hydrogen under pressure in the megabar range, generation of novel superconductors, magnetic structures, glasses and superhard materials under high pressure; the applications in chemistry include new compounds under high pressure. Hemley's research has been experimental (e.g. high-pressure studies with spectroscopic methods and  generating high pressures with laser-heated diamond anvil cell) and theoretical; he used theory to develop high-pressure experimental methods in conjunction with microscopic laser-optical and X-ray diffraction analysis in situ from synchrotron radiation sources. Hemley worked in the late 1980s with Ho-Kwang Mao, who became famous for his 1976 work with Peter M. Bell on extension of the laboratory pressure range up to pressures over 1 megabar. Hemley, Mao, and Bell investigated not only minerals under pressures corresponding to those in the Earth's interior but also gases and liquids under pressures believed to exist in the interiors of gas giants such as Jupiter and Saturn. In particular, they investigated the behavior of hydrogen at pressures in the megabar range.

Hemley has published over 490 articles as an author or co-author and has been awarded several patents.

Hemley received in 2005 the Balzan Prize jointly with Ho-Kwang Mao and in 2009 the Bridgman Award. He is a fellow of the American Academy of Arts and Sciences, the American Geophysical Union and the American Physical Society. In 2001 he was elected a member of the National Academy of Sciences. Since 2003 he has been a member of the JASON Defense Advisory Group.

References

External links
Russell J. Hemley, Geophysical Laboratory, Carnegie Institute of Washington

1954 births
Living people
American geophysicists
21st-century American chemists
Fellows of the American Physical Society
Fellows of the American Geophysical Union
Members of the United States National Academy of Sciences
Fellows of the American Academy of Arts and Sciences
Harvard University alumni
Wesleyan University alumni